Super League XXII commenced on 9 February 2017 and ended on 7 October with the Super League Grand Final. It consisted of 23 regular season games and 7 rounds of relevant play-offs following which there were two play-off semi-finals and the grand final.

Regular season

Round 1

Rearranged Round 11

This round is played by the teams entering the Challenge Cup in the 5th round which coincides with the dates for Round 11.

Round 2

Round 3

Round 4

Round 5

Round 6

Round 7

Round 8

Round 9 (Easter/Good Friday)

Round 10 (Easter Monday)

Round 11

Round 12

Round 13

Round 14 (Magic Weekend)

Round 15

Round 16

Round 17

Round 18

Rearranged Round 16

Original match (29 May) postponed due to Huddersfield Town's play off final at Wembley Stadium

Round 19

Round 20

Round 21

Round 22

Round 23

Super 8s

References

Super League XXII